Nitin Saini (born 28 October 1988) is a cricketer who plays for Haryana in Indian domestic cricket. He has also played for the Indian Premier League franchise team Kings XI Punjab. Saini is a right-hand wicket-keeper batsman who usually opens the batting.

Career 
Saini made his first-class cricket debut for Haryana at the age of 18 against Saurashtra during the 2006/07 season of the Ranji Trophy. He earned a permanent spot for his state side with impressive performances in all three formats of the game. In the 2011/12 season he scored 631 runs in eight matches at a batting average of 40, scoring five fifties and a hundred. Soon after he signed a contract with Kings XI Punjab to play in the 2012 Indian Premier League, only playing for the side in the one season.

Saini scored over 900 runs in the 2016/17 Ranji Trophy, one of the highest aggregates in the trophy's history.

References

External links 

Indian cricketers
Haryana cricketers
Punjab Kings cricketers
North Zone cricketers
Living people
1988 births
India Green cricketers
Wicket-keepers